Pasha Malla is a Canadian author.

He was born in St. John's, Newfoundland and raised in London, Ontario. He attended Concordia University in Montreal as a graduate student. During his days in London, Ont. Pasha attended Sir Frederick Banting S.S, where he played basketball and was a founding member of the Backyard Soccer League. 

His debut book, The Withdrawal Method, a collection of short stories, won the Trillium Book Award and the Danuta Gleed Literary Award, as well as being shortlisted for the Commonwealth Prize and longlisted for the Scotiabank Giller Prize. One of his short stories, "Filmsong", won an Arthur Ellis Award while another was published on Joyland: A hub for short fiction.

Later that year, Snare Books released All Our Grandfathers Are Ghosts, a collection of poetry. His first novel, People Park, was published in 2012.

Pasha is an infrequent contributor to The Walrus.

Books
2008: The Withdrawal Method, House of Anansi, 
2008: All Our Grandfathers Are Ghosts, Snare Books, 
2012: People Park
2015: Erratic Fire, Erratic Passion: The poetry of sportstalk, Featherproof Books 
2018: Fugue States, Vintage Canada 
2020: Kill the Mall

References

Living people
Writers from London, Ontario
Canadian male short story writers
Canadian writers of Asian descent
21st-century Canadian poets
Canadian male novelists
21st-century Canadian novelists
Writers from St. John's, Newfoundland and Labrador
Canadian male poets
21st-century Canadian short story writers
21st-century Canadian male writers
Year of birth missing (living people)